Lisa Lorraine Byrne (born 12 April 1970, Shrewsbury) is the Editor of the UK edition of the worldwide celebrity gossip magazine, OK!.

Career
She began her career as the Editor of the Northallerton, Thirsk and Bedale Times in 1994 (the newspaper closed in 2008).

In 1995 she moved to London and became a freelance writer for the Mail on Sunday, Sunday Mirror, and the Sunday People.

OK!
From 1998 she was a features writer, then Senior Writer and Features Editor on OK!. In 2002 she became the deputy editor. She became Editor of OK! in 2004. OK! magazine is part of Express Newspapers group, owned by Northern & Shell and is based at 10 Lower Thames Street.

She has completed the National Council for the Training of Journalists course. OK! magazine sells around 470,000 copies a week. OK! Magazine International is based at Northern & Shell Worldwide in Luxembourg, near Luxembourg railway station.

References

English magazine editors
1970 births
Northern & Shell
Living people